The Solar Energy Research Center (SERC) is a research center dedicated to identifying methods for converting solar energy to renewable fuel sources. SERC opened on 25 May 2015 at the Lawrence Berkeley National Laboratory (LBL) in Berkeley, California. SERC is housed at the newly opened Chu Hall, named for Steven Chu.

References

External links

SERC at LBL website

Science and technology in the San Francisco Bay Area
Lawrence Berkeley National Laboratory
2015 establishments in California
Solar power in the United States
Buildings and structures in Berkeley, California
Buildings and structures completed in 2015
Energy research